Großschweidnitz is a municipality in the district Görlitz, in Saxony, Germany.

References 

Populated places in Görlitz (district)